Heroes of the West is a 1963 Italian Spaghetti Western film directed by Steno.

Story
Two stage robbers impersonate the heirs of a gold mine but end up defending the families they intended to ripoff.

Cast
Walter Chiari - Mike
Raimondo Vianello - Colorado
Silvia Solar - Margaret
Beni Deus - Bill
María Andersen - Barbara
Tomás Blanco - Mayor Ortes
Miguel Del Castillo - Jessie
Mónica Randall - Sherry
Antonio Peral - Il Boia
Mercedes Lobato, Bruno Scipioni, Mercedes Lobato, Xan das Bolas, Santiago Rivera, Adolfo Arles

External links
 
 Heroes of the West at Variety Distribution

1963 films
1960s Italian-language films
Italian Western (genre) comedy films
1960s Western (genre) comedy films
Films scored by Gianni Ferrio
Films with screenplays by José Mallorquí
1960s Italian films